Lady Ninja Kasumi is a five-part film series licensed by Tokyo Shock and Kitty Media. It was released on DVD in December 2011. This series consists of five DVD volumes. Each one is 75–80 minutes long.

Parts
Volume 1: Lady Ninja Kasumi
Volume 2: Love and Betrayal 
Volume 3: Secret Skills
Volume 4: Birth of a Ninja
Volume 5: Counter Attack

Ratings 
(issued by Tokyo Shock and Kitty Media)
USA
Edited version: 16 Up
Original version: 18 Up
Canada
14A

Tokyo Shock
Kitty Media
Ninja films